Representations of the shark are common in popular culture in the Western world, with a range of media generally portraying them of eating machines and threats. In some media, however, comedy is drawn from portrayals of sharks running counter to their popular image, with shark characters being portrayed as unexpectedly friendly or otherwise comical. The lists below give an approximate sample of the many forms of representation of the shark in popular culture.

Cartoons 
Sharks are sometimes seen in Tom and Jerry
 Jabberjaw is a cartoon shark and the lead character in the eponymous cartoon series
 Kenny the Shark is an anthropomorphic tiger shark
 Sharky the sharkdog from Eek! The Cat
 Sharky & George
 Rin Matsuoka, Free!
 Kisame Hoshigaki, Naruto
 The DIC Entertainment series, Street Sharks, featured crime-fighting man-shark hybrids
 In a season two episode of Captain Planet, sharks are the main focus
 In a season one episode of ThunderCats, a cross between a shark and a black widow is featured
 Sharks appear in several episodes of the animated series Aquaman
 The shark appears in two episodes of Oggy and the Cockroaches
 TigerSharks
 Zig and Sharko

Comics 
 King Shark, a humanoid shark supervillain created by DC Comics
 Tiger Shark, an enemy of Namor the Sub-Mariner
 Warren White, an enemy of Batman
 Tiger Shark, an identity assumed by two separate DC Comics characters
 The Shark, an identity assumed by three different DC Comics characters
 Sharks are sometimes seen swimming in Aquaman comics

Film 

The Jaws franchise follows a series of man-eating shark attacks. The first film Jaws, directed by Steven Spielberg, stars Roy Scheider, Robert Shaw, and Richard Dreyfuss, three men who set out to kill a bloodthirsty great white shark. The film's sequel, Jaws 2 which in turn made enough profit for more sequels without Scheider, Jaws 3-D and Jaws 4: The Revenge. 
 Various James Bond films depict sharks as man-eating predators, e.g. Thunderball, Live and Let Die, The Spy Who Loved Me, For Your Eyes Only and Licence to Kill, used as violent forms of execution for traitors or alleged traitors to Bond's enemies. In the Austin Powers film series, which parodies many elements of the Bond films, the villain Dr. Evil is quite displeased when he is unable to acquire sharks with laser beams attached to their heads. His wish is granted in the third film.
 A shark makes an appearance in Batman: The Movie, attacking Batman as he ascends up a helicopter ladder, and explodes after being sprayed with Bat-shark repellent.
 Shark!, a 1969 action film.
Anchor, Bruce, and Chum, a hammerhead shark, a great white shark and a mako shark, respectively, are a trio of sharks from the 2003 Disney/Pixar animated film, Finding Nemo. The three are depicted as vegetarians, who are fighting their instinctive desires to eat innocent fish.
 A family of great white sharks feature in the 2004 DreamWorks Animation animated film, Shark Tale.
 Maccus from Pirates of the Caribbean: Dead Man's Chest and Pirates of the Caribbean: At World's End had his scarred head the appearance of that of a hammerhead shark and also had sharp, fang-like teeth much like those of a shark.
 A shark briefly appears in Madagascar 2: Escape to Africa.
 The Sharknado franchise depicts sharks getting sucked into tornadoes and raining down upon people.
A whale shark called Destiny features in the 2016 Disney/Pixar animated film Finding Dory.
 Undead sharks appear in the 2017 Disney film, Pirates of the Caribbean: Dead Men Tell No Tales.
 The Meg, a 2018 action film.

Internet 
 Helicopter Shark, a composite photo of a shark leaping out of the ocean attacking military personnel climbing a Sikorsky UH-60 Black Hawk helicopter ladder.
Hololive EN Vtuber Gawr Gura, whose motif is based on a shark.
  Deep Blue, A female great white that is believed to be one of the largest of her species. Deep Blue went viral due to her media exposure from shark week, facebook and video footage of Ocean Ramsey swimming with her.
 Hurricane Shark or Street Shark, nicknames for claims of a shark swimming in a flooded urban area, usually after a hurricane. Most such claims have been hoaxes; however, a 2022 video of a shark or other large fish swimming in Hurricane Ian's floodwaters in Fort Myers, Florida, proved to be authentic.

Magazines and literature 
 Jaws, the book by Peter Benchley that the 1975 movie was based on. It tells a tale of a great white shark that terrorizes the small resort town of Amity Island, and three men who set out on a boat to track it down and kill it.
 Jaws 2 and Jaws: The Revenge, two film novelizations both written by Hank Searls 
 A pregnant great white in another Peter Benchley novel, White Shark
 I Survived the Shark Attacks of 1916, a book by Lauren Tarshis
 The Devil's Teeth by Susan Casey
 Close to Shore by Michael Capuzzo about the Jersey Shore shark attacks of 1916
 Twelve Days of Terror by Richard Fernicola about the same events

Music 
 "Baby Shark", a children's song featuring a family of sharks. Popular as a campfire song, it has taken off since 2016, when Pinkfong, a South Korean education company, turned it into a viral video which spread through social media, online video, and radio.

Roleplaying games 
 The weresharks of Dungeons & Dragons
 The Rokea weresharks of Werewolf: The Apocalypse

As mascots

Schools, colleges and universities 
 Razor the Shark of Nova Southeastern University
 The Perry Sharks are the school animal of the Oliver Hazard Perry School, South Boston, Massachusetts
 Tony the Landshark, an anthropomorphic shark currently used as the mascot for the Ole Miss Rebels (University of Mississippi)

Sporting teams 
 Colombian football team Atlético Junior de Barranquilla is nicknamed The Sharks, its mascot being an antropomorphic great white shark called Willy.
 A shark is the mascot of UNLV men's basketball, though not of the athletic program as a whole. The use of a shark was established under the head coaching tenure of Jerry Tarkanian, nicknamed "Tark the Shark".
 Antibes Sharks, a French professional basketball team
 The Camden Riversharks, a baseball team based in New Jersey
 Named after the thresher shark, the Clearwater Threshers, are a minor league baseball from Florida
 The Cronulla Sharks, an Australian rugby league team
 The East Fremantle Sharks, an Australian rules football team
 Hawaii Pacific Sharks – NCAA Division II athletic program of Hawaii Pacific University
 Hull F.C. (once known as Hull Sharks), an English rugby league team who have now reverted to the name Hull F.C.
 The Jacksonville Sharks, the reigning champion of the Arena Football League
 Named after the hammerhead shark, the Jupiter Hammerheads are a minor league baseball team
 LIU Sharks – NCAA Division I athletic program of Long Island University
 The Orlando Sharks, a U.S. indoor soccer team
 The NSU Sharks, NCAA Division II athletic program of Nova Southeastern University
 The Sale Sharks, an English rugby union team
 The San Jose Sharks, a U.S. National Hockey League team
 The Shanghai Sharks, a Chinese basketball team
 Sharks F.C., a Nigerian football team
 The Sheffield Sharks, an English basketball team
 The Sharks, a South African rugby union team
 The Worcester Sharks, a professional ice hockey team

Television 
 Shark Week
 Shark Tank, a reality show with a title card and name based on sharks
 Several myths about sharks have been tested in MythBusters
 "The Shark Fighter!", an episode of The Aquabats! Super Show! featuring a gang of mutant legged "land sharks" who attack a beachside city.
 Noel Fielding's Luxury Comedy, features a hammerhead shark called Todd Lagoona played by Richard Ayoade.
 Doubutsu Sentai Zyuohger, features a shark girl that called Sela

Video games & pinball machines 
Sharks variously appear in video games, arcade games and pinball machines. In video games, they typically appear either as playable characters or threats to the player. Sharks also make cameo appearances in some popular games and game series. The 1975 movie Jaws and its sequels inspired several licensed and unlicensed games.

Pinball machines 
Sharks feature prominently in several pinball machines including:

 Sea Hunt, a 1972 machine inspired by the 1960s television program, manufactured by Leisure & Allied
 White Shark, a 1979 machine by Bell Coin Matic
 Shark, a 1980 machine by A. Hankin & Co.
 Shark, a 1982 machine by Taito
 Atlantis, a 1989 machine by Bally

Early video games 
Killer Shark by Sega is a 1972 electro-mechanical game where the player points and shoots a mock spear-gun at a projected shark that swims towards him. The game features on-screen in the movie Jaws.
Shark Jaws is a single-player arcade game by Atari, Inc. that was intended to capitalise on the popularity of the film Jaws without being licensed to use the name
Shark is a 1978 game for the Commodore PET in which the player controls a shark and must eat swimmers without being caught by a diver.
Blue Shark is a 1978 arcade game by Midway in which the player shoots sea creatures, including a shark while a timer counts down.
Terror at Selachii Bay is a one-player strategy game wherein the player provisions and skippers a boat hunting a shark using harpoons.
Shark Attack is a 1981 arcade game in which the player controls a shark and must eat scuba divers.
 Jaws, a video game for the Nintendo Entertainment System.
 Shark! Shark! is a 1982 video game for the Intellivision, in which the player controls a fish and has to avoid being eaten by a shark.
 Shark Attack is a game by Apollo for the Atari 2600.
 Alive Sharks is a 1990 shareware game for DOS in which the player controls a scuba diver who must collect sea creatures from the ocean floor while avoiding shark bites and jellyfish stings. A sequel called VGA Sharks followed, and was updated between 1990 and 1994.
 In the 1998 arcade game The Ocean Hunter, one or two players must fight off sharks and other sea creatures while searching for seven sea monsters, including a megalodon.
 3D Shark Hunting is a first-person perspective shark-hunting simulator released in 1999.

21st century video games 
 Shark! Hunting the Great White is a 2001 first-person shark hunting simulator.
 Dreamworks' Shark Tale game was released by Activision in 2004 for several consoles. The player is Oscar the fish, but sharks feature prominently in the game.
 Jaws Unleashed, is a 2006 game for the PlayStation 2, Xbox, and Microsoft Windows.
 Jaws: Ultimate Predator, is a game for the Wii and Nintendo 3DS set 35 years after the events of the original 1975 movie.
 The Hungry Shark series of mobile games allows the player to swim, leap and feed as a variety of real and imaginary shark species
 Derrick the Death Fin is a 2012 side-scrolling game in which the player controls a paper-craft shark.
 Depth is a sharks vs. humans underwater combat simulator where players can choose to be a human or one of several shark species.
 Maneater, a video game for the Xbox one featuring a bull shark as the playable animal. While its species is a bull shark, the game features various evolutions and mutations for the shark.

Minor appearances in video games 
 Sharpedo is a Pokémon from Generation III of the game series that is the evolutionary successor to the Pokémon known as Carvanha.
 Sharks are a secondary threat to the player character in the 1984 Taito game, Sea Fighter Poseidon.
 Sharks are underwater enemies in a few entries of both the Mario and Donkey Kong franchises.
 Sharks are occasional enemies in the Ecco the Dolphin series of games.
 Finding Nemo, a video game for Nintendo GameCube, PlayStation 2, Xbox, Game Boy Advance and PC.
 Tiny is the name of a great white shark featured in Batman: Arkham City. Tiny was an attraction at Gotham Museum's "Terrors of the Deep" aquarium before the Penguin bought the building and turned it into his hideout.
 Whale sharks can be found in World of Warcraft: Cataclysm.
 Sharks can be seen underwater in Tomb Raider: Underworld.
 Sharks are seen as both enemies and hunting opportunities in Assassin's Creed IV: Black Flag.
 Sharks appear in Grand Theft Auto V.
 Tiger sharks can be seen underwater and attack in Call of Duty: Ghost.
 Various types of sharks can be caught in the oceans of the Animal Crossing series

See also

 Shark
 List of sharks
 Sharks in art

References

Sharks
Fish in popular culture
Marine life in popular culture